In modern archery, a compound bow is a bow that uses a levering system, usually of cables and pulleys, to bend the limbs.

In general, compound bows are widely used in target practice and hunting.

The pulley/cam system grants the user a mechanical advantage, and so the limbs of a compound bow are much stiffer than those of a recurve bow or longbow. This rigidity makes the compound bow more energy-efficient than other bows, as less energy is dissipated in limb movement. The higher-rigidity, higher-technology construction also improves accuracy by reducing the bow's sensitivity to changes in temperature and humidity.

The pulley/cam system also confers a benefit called "let-off." As the string is drawn back, the cams rotate. The cams are eccentric rather than round, and so their effective radius changes as they rotate. Each of a compound bow's two cams features two tracks: an inner track which connects to the opposite limb or opposite cam through cables, and an outer track through which the bowstring runs.  As the bow is drawn, the ratio of bowstring pay-out and cable take-up relative to limb-weight and leverage of the cams changes.  By manipulation of the shapes of these cam tracks, different draw-stroke profiles can be created.  A compound bow can be soft-drawing with a slow build-up to peak weight and a gradual let-off with a long "valley" at the end.  It can also be hard-drawing with a very fast build-up to peak draw-weight, a long plateau where weight is maintained, and a quick let-off with a short valley.  The let-off itself is the result of the cam profiles having passed center and approaching a condition very similar to a cam-lock.  In some compound bows, if the draw-stops or draw-length modules are removed, they will self-lock at full draw and require professional equipment to unlock safely. Many compound bows offer 70–85% let off once they are pulled to full draw. This allows the shooter to relax and concentrate on the intended target at which they are shooting.

The compound bow was first developed in 1966 by Holless Wilbur Allen in North Kansas City, Missouri, and a US patent was granted in 1969. The compound bow has become increasingly popular. In the United States, the compound is the dominant form of bow.

In literature of the early 20th century, before the invention of compound bows, composite bows were described as "compound". This usage is now outdated.

Construction

A bow's central mount for other components such as the limbs, sights, stabilizers and quivers is called the riser. Risers are designed to be as rigid as possible. The central riser of a compound bow is usually made of aluminum, magnesium alloy, or carbon fiber and many are made of 7075 aluminum alloy.

Limbs are made of fiberglass-based composite materials and are capable of taking high tensile and compressive forces. The limbs store all the energy of the bow – no energy is stored in the pulleys and cables.

In the most common configuration, there is a cam or wheel at the end of each limb. The shape of the cam may vary somewhat between different bow designs. There are several different concepts of using the cams to store energy in the limbs, and these all fall under a category called bow eccentrics. The four most common types of bow eccentrics are Single Cam, Hybrid Cam, Dual Cam and Binary Cam. However, there are also other less common designs, like the Quad Cam and Hinged. Cams are often described using their "let-off" rating. As a cam is rotated, the force required to hold the bow in position reaches a peak and then decreases as the bow approaches maximum extension (a position known as "the wall"). The percent-difference between the maximum force encountered during the draw and the force required to hold the bow in full extension is the "let-off". This value is commonly between 65% and 80% of the peak weight for recently designed compound bows, although some older compound bows provided a let-off of only 50% and some recent designs achieve let-offs in excess of 90%.

The photo on the right shows the axle attaching the limb to cam is mounted at the edge of the cam as opposed to the center. As the string is drawn the cam turns and imparts force to compress the limb. Initially, the archer has the 'short' side of the cam, with the leverage being a mechanical disadvantage. High energy input is therefore required. When near full draw is reached, the cam has turned to its full extent, the archer has gained mechanical advantage, and the least amount of force needs to be applied to the string to keep the limbs bent. This is known as "let off". The lower holding weight enables the archer to maintain the bow fully drawn and take more time to aim. This let-off enables the archer to accurately shoot a compound bow with a much higher peak draw weight than other bows (see below).

However, there are some youth-oriented compound bows with low draw weights that have no let-off and have a maximum draw length deliberately set farther than the majority of young shooters would reach.  This effectively makes the bow function very similar to a recurve, with the draw length determined by the shooter's preferred anchor point. This removes the necessity to adjust the bow draw length or use a different bow for different shooters (or to change bows as the shooter gets older). An example of this type of bow is the Genesis, which is standard equipment in the U.S. National Archery in the Schools Program.

Compound bow strings and cables are normally made of high-modulus polyethylene and are designed to have great tensile strength and minimal stretchability, so that the bow transfers its energy to the arrow as efficiently and durably as possible. In earlier models of compound bows, the cables were often made of plastic-coated steel.

Comparison to other bow types

Technical advantages

 The function of the cam systems (known as the 'eccentrics') is to maximize the energy storage throughout the draw cycle and provide let-off at the end of the cycle (less holding weight at full draw).  A traditional recurve bow has a very linear draw weight curve - meaning that as the bow is drawn back, the draw force becomes heavier with each inch of draw (and most difficult at full draw).  Therefore, little energy is stored in the first half of the draw, and much more energy at the end where the draw weight is heaviest.  The compound bow operates with a different weight profile, reaching its peak weight within the first few inches of the draw, and remaining more flat and constant until the end of the cycle where the cams "let-off" and allow a reduced holding weight.  This manipulation of the peak weight throughout the draw (accomplished by the elliptical shape of the cams that change leverage and mechanical advantage) is why compound bows store more energy and shoot faster than an equivalent peak weight recurve bow or longbow.
The design of the cams directly controls the acceleration of the arrow. What is termed a "soft cam" will accelerate the arrow more gently than a "harder" cam. Novice archers will typically shoot a soft cam whereas a more advanced archer may choose to use a harder cam to gain speed. Bows can be had with a variety of cams, in a full spectrum from soft to hard.
Some pulley systems use a single cam at the bottom of the bow and a round idler wheel at the top of the bow instead of two identical cams. This design eliminates the need for a separate control cable and instead uses a single long string that begins at the cam on the bottom of the bow, travels over the wheel on top, and back to the bottom cam. A separate buss cable then connects the bottom cam to the top limb.
When a compound bow is drawn, the limbs are pulled in toward each other by the cables, unlike a longbow or recurve where the limbs flex in the direction of the bow string.  This difference allows modern compounds to have limbs that are closer to horizontal instead of angled.  The horizontal, or "parallel" limb configuration minimizes the recoil and vibration felt by the shooter when the arrow is released, as the forces going upward at the top limb and downward at the bottom limb cancel each other out.
The pulley system will usually include some rubber-covered blocks that act as draw-stops. These provide a solid "wall" that the archer can draw against. These draw stops can be adjusted to suit the archer's optimum draw-length, which helps the archer achieve a consistent anchor point and a consistent amount of force imparted to the arrow on every shot, further increasing accuracy.

Technical disadvantages
 A relatively larger number of moving parts requires additional maintenance and creates more points of failure.
 Dry firing is more likely to damage or destroy a compound bow due to the greater amount of energy stored and released.
 Unlike traditional bows, replacing the string or cables or making adjustments to let-off or draw length often require a bow press, a specialized tool used for compressing the limbs, taking tension off the cables and string.
Drawing a compound bow with the fingers increases the likelihood of torquing the bowstring, and thus derailing the string from the cams. Thus often requiring the use of a mechanical release-aid.
Usually heavier than recurves and longbows.

Circumstantial advantages
 Compound archers often use a mechanical release aid to hold and release the string. This attaches to the bowstring near the point where the arrow attaches, the nocking point, and permits the archer to release the string with a squeeze of a trigger or a slight increase of tension. The use of a release aid gives a more consistent release than the use of fingers on the string as it minimises the arrow oscillation which is inevitable when the bowstring is released directly from the fingers.
 In tournaments, competition rules for compound archers allow bows with a sighting system, consisting of a "peep sight" held within the bowstring that acts as a back sight, however front sights attached to the riser are allowable in other classes.  Some front sights are magnifying and/or adjustable for targets at different distances.  Some sights have multiple "pins" set up for targets at different distances.

Circumstantial disadvantages
The relatively low holding weight of a compound bow compared to a recurve bow makes the compound more sensitive to certain shooting form faults when the archer is at full draw. In particular, it's easier for the archer to torque (twist) the bow around the vertical axis, leading to left-right errors, and also a plucked or snatched release can have more effect.

Specifications
AMO (Archery Manufacturers and merchants Organization, the former name of the body now known as the Archery Trade Association) standard draw length is the distance from the string at full draw to the lowest point on the grip plus . Because the draw force may increase more or less rapidly, and again drop off more or less rapidly when approaching peak draw, bows of the same peak draw force can store different amounts of energy. Norbert Mullaney has defined the ratio of stored energy to peak draw force (S.E./P.D.F.). This is usually around  but can reach .

The efficiency of bows also varies. Normally between 70–85% of the stored energy is transferred to the arrow. This stored energy is referred to as potential energy. When transferred to the arrow it is referred to as kinetic energy. The product of S.E./P.D.F. and efficiency can be called the power factor. There are two measurement standards of this quantity – AMO and IBO speed.

Brace height is the distance from the pivot point of the grip to the string at rest.  Typically a shorter brace height will result in an increased power stroke, but comes at the price of a bow that's less forgiving to shooter error and having harsher string slap.

Arrows used

Arrows used with compound bows do not differ significantly from those used with recurve bows, being typically either aluminum alloy, carbon fiber, or a composite of the two materials. Wooden arrows are not commonly used on compound bows because of their fragility.  Most arrows in use today are of the carbon fiber variety.  An important distinction arrow-wise between recurve bows and compound bows is that of arrow spine.  Compound bows and target recurve bows with fully center-shot cutaway risers tend to be very forgiving in regard to spine selection. Modern compound bows are typically equipped with substantially stiffer arrows than an equivalent draw-length and draw-weight recurve bow would be.  Another advantage of the center-shot riser is that the arrow need not bend around the riser (nearly as much or at all) during the shot.  Fine-tuning may be accomplished by adjustment of the arrow rest, or nock point on the string, rather than by changing arrow-length and tip weight. 

Manufacturers produce arrow shafts with different weights, different spines (stiffness), and different lengths in the same model of shaft to accommodate different draw weights and lengths, matched to archers' different styles, preferences and physical attributes.

Arrow stiffness (spine) is an important parameter in finding arrows that will shoot accurately from any particular bow (see Archer's paradox), the spine varying with both the construction and length of the arrow.

Another important consideration is that the IBO (International Bowhunting Organization) recommends at least  of draw weight as a safety buffer. This means a bow that draws  would need at least a  finished-with-tip arrow. Shooting arrows lighter than this guideline risks damage to the bow similar to that caused by dry-firing, which can in turn cause injury to the archer or anyone standing nearby. Shooting arrows that are too light also voids most manufacturer warranties.

See also
 Bow shape
 Bow (weapon)
 Binary cam
 Crossbow
 English longbow
 Flatbow
 Horse archer
 Yumi

Construction techniques
 Self bow
 Cable-backed bow
 Laminated bow
 Composite bow

References

General references

 (1992) The Traditional Bowyers Bible Volume 1. The Lyons Press. 
 (1992) The Traditional Bowyers Bible Volume 2. The Lyons Press. 
 (1994) The Traditional Bowyers Bible Volume 3. The Lyons Press.

External links

Extensive article on the compound bow Twenty-five years after Allen's patent of December 1969. 
Photos of compound bows from the 1970s

Bows (archery)